The year 1929 in archaeology involved some significant events.

Explorations
 Expedition under Neil Merton Judd to collect dendrochronological specimens to date habitation of Chaco Canyon.
 Blackwater Draw, New Mexico, first recognized as archaeologically significant by Ridgely Whiteman.

Excavations
 Agora in Athens.
 Amri.
 Excavations at Ugarit by Claude F. A. Schaeffer begin; first texts in Ugaritic discovered.
 New excavations of Tell Halaf, Syria, by Max von Oppenheim.
 Excavations of palaeolithic sites at Mount Carmel, including the first of the Skhul and Qafzeh hominins, by Dorothy Garrod begin (continue to 1934).
 First of the Pazyryk burials in Siberia, by M. P. Gryaznov.
 Grobiņa in Latvia, by Birger Nerman.
 Chinese archeologist Pei Wenzhong appointed field director of the continuing excavations at Peking Man Site in Zhoukoudian, China.
 Whitehawk Camp near Brighton in England by R. P. Ross Williamson and E. Cecil Curwen.

Finds
 June 22: Beam HH-39 is extracted at the Show Low site in Arizona enabling A. E. Douglass to construct a continuous dendrochronology record back to AD 700 for the Southwestern United States.
 December 1: Chinese archaeologist Pei Wenzhong unearths the first skullcap at Peking Man Site in Zhoukoudian, China.
 Jade relics at Sanxingdui in China.
 Mummy of Queen Meritamen (daughter of Thutmose III).
 Roman Amphitheatre at Chester (England) found by Hugh Thompson.
 Ruins of Kamiros on Rhodes.
 Guido Ucelli discovers the barges of Caligula in Lake Nemi.
 The Lyres of Ur in the tomb of Puabi.

Publications
 V. Gordon Childe - The Danube in Prehistory.

Births
 July 17: Elin C. Danien, American scholar of ancient Maya ceramics (died 2019)
 September 23: Viktor Sarianidi, Soviet archaeologist, discoverer of the Bactria–Margiana Archaeological Complex (died 2013)

Deaths
 Rodolfo Amadeo Lanciani, Italian archaeologist (born 1845)

References

Archaeology
Archaeology
Archaeology by year